Otto Friedrich Theodor von Möller, russified as Fyodor Antonovich Moller (Russian: Фёдор Антонович Моллер; 30 May 1812 – 2 August 1874) was a Russian Academic painter of Baltic-German ancestry.

Biography 
At the age of five, he was enrolled at the cadet school, where he remained until he was 14, then served in the Semyonovsky Regiment. After being wounded in the Polish November Uprising, he took up drawing during his convalescence and decided to attend classes at the Imperial Academy of Fine Arts.

Once there, he became a favorite student of Karl Briullov. He first exhibited in 1832 with a scene of the Battle of Ostrołęka. In 1835, he was awarded a gold medal for painting and resigned from the army. He received another gold medal in 1837.

After graduating in 1838, he went to Italy to complete his studies. He continued to send paintings home and, in 1840, was named "Academician" for his work "The Kiss". While there, he also became a close friend of Nikolai Gogol and painted him several times, which portraits are among his best-known works.

After a brief stay in Russia in 1847, he returned to Rome, where he met Johann Friedrich Overbeck and the Nazarene movement. His work in that style, "Sermon of the Apostle John on the Island of Patmos", led to his becoming  "Professor of Historical Painting" when he returned to Russia in 1856. That same year, he married Dorothea von Güldenstubbe, who was only sixteen.

Back in Saint Petersburg, he devoted himself to teaching and managing a pension fund for artists at the Imperial Society for the Encouragement of the Arts. His works include a series of paintings of Alexander Nevsky for the Grand Kremlin Palace and murals for Saint Isaac's Cathedral.

He was suddenly taken ill while working on the Crucifixion in the village of Võnnu (Wendau). He died of pneumonia at the family estate on the island of Saaremaa.

Gallery

References

External links 

"An artist with wonderful talent and comfortable means" by Lyudmila Markina, from the Tretyakov Gallery magazine. 
Moller's portrait of Gogol a transcribed interview from Echo of Moscow 
Gogol's portrait @ Portraits of Russian Writers

1812 births
1874 deaths
People from Kronstadt
People from Petergofsky Uyezd
Baltic-German people
19th-century painters from the Russian Empire
Russian male painters
Russian portrait painters
Religious artists
Muralists
Deaths from pneumonia in Estonia
19th-century male artists from the Russian Empire